Jane Clive is a costume designer. She is known for her work on movies Henry V ,  Restoration, Topsy-Turvy, Snow White and the Huntsman and Maleficent.

She was nominated for a Costume Designers Guild Award for her work on Maleficent.

Selected filmography
 Henry V (1989)
 Little Buddha (1993)
 Mary Shelley's Frankenstein (1994)
 Angels and Insects (1995)
 Restoration (1995)
 Lost in Space (1998)
 Topsy-Turvy (1999)
 Quills (2000)
 From Hell (2001)
 Planet of the Apes (2001)
 Shanghai Knights (2003)
 Around the World in 80 Days (2004)
 Oliver Twist (2005)
 Sahara (2005)
 Captain America: The First Avenger (2011)
 Snow White and the Huntsman (2012)
 Maleficent (2014)

References

External links

Costume designers
Living people
Year of birth missing (living people)
Place of birth missing (living people)